The Longview–Marshall Combined Statistical Area covers four counties in Northeast Texas. The statistical area consists of the Longview Metropolitan Statistical Area and the Marshall Micropolitan Statistical Area. Prior to 2003, the area was known as the Longview–Marshall Metropolitan Statistical Area, which consisted of Gregg, Harrison, Rusk, and Upshur counties. As of the 2000 census, the CSA had a population of 256,152 (though a July 1, 2009 estimate placed the population at 271,669).

Counties
 Gregg
 Harrison
 Rusk
 Upshur

Communities

Places with more than 50,000 people
 Longview (Principal city)

Places with 10,000 to 25,000 people
 Henderson
 Kilgore
 Marshall (Principal city)

Places with 1,000 to 10,000 people
 Big Sandy
 Gilmer
 Gladewater
 Hallsville
 Ore City
 Overton (partial)
 Tatum (partial)
 Waskom
 White Oak

Places with 500 to 1,000 people
 Clarksville City
 East Mountain
 Easton
 Lakeport
 Mount Enterprise
 New London

Places with fewer than 500 people
 Nesbitt
 Reklaw (partial)
 Scottsville
 Uncertain
 Union Grove
 Warren City

Unincorporated places
 Concord
 Diana
 Elderville
 Elysian Fields
 Gill
 Harleton
 Joinerville
 Jonesville
 Judson
 Karnack
 Laird Hill
 Laneville
 Latex
 Leverett's Chapel
 Liberty City
 Price
 Selman City
 Turnertown
 Woodlawn

Demographics
As of the census of 2000, there were 256,152 people, 96,428 households, and 69,372 families residing within the CSA. The racial makeup of the CSA was 74.65% White, 19.41% African American, 0.46% Native American, 0.44% Asian, 0.03% Pacific Islander, 3.74% from other races, and 1.27% from two or more races. Hispanic or Latino of any race were 7.37% of the population.

The median income for a household in the CSA was $33,693 and the median income for a family was $40,443. Males had a median income of $31,952 versus $20,656 for females. The per capita income for the CSA was $17,046.

See also
 List of cities in Texas
 Texas census statistical areas
 List of Texas metropolitan areas

References

Geography of Gregg County, Texas
Geography of Harrison County, Texas
Geography of Rusk County, Texas
Geography of Upshur County, Texas
Combined statistical areas of the United States
Metropolitan areas of Texas